Carla van de Puttelaar (born 1 November 1967) is a Dutch fine art photographer and art historian. She holds a PhD in Art History from Utrecht University.

Biography
Van de Puttelaar was born in Zaandam, The Netherlands. She attended the Rietveld Academie in Amsterdam from 1991 to 1996. She specializes in portrait photography, also portraying nudes. In 2017 she gained her PhD in Art History from Utrecht university. She specializes in Dutch and Scottish seventeenth and early eighteenth century portraiture and her seminal book on Scottish Portraiture 1644-1714 was published with Brepols in December 2021. From 2011 to 2014 she taught at the Royal Academy of Art, The Hague

In 2017 she started the portrait project Artfully Dressed: Women in the Art World, that consists of over 550 portraits of women in the art worldwide, working in different areas of the art, of various ages and cultural backgrounds.

Her work has been shown in museum and other venues around the work and in 2020 she had a retrospective show entitled: Brushed by Light at the National Museum of History and Art in Luxembourg, consisting of 78 works and spanning 22 years. The exhibition was accompanied by a catalog with an introduction by the eminent art historian Rudi Ekkart. In 2021 she collaborated with Iris van Herpen which resulted in the project and exhibition entitled: Synergia.

She currently lives and works in Amsterdam, The Netherlands.

Work
Like the works of other contemporary Dutch photographers, such as Rineke Dijkstra, Hellen van Meene and Desiree Dolron, her works show influences of Dutch Golden Age painting in their composition, use of light and color, and rendering of textures and surfaces.

To achieve her photographic effects, she utilizes film, but in more recent years also uses digital photography. Several of her works are untitled, enhancing the effect of alienation, while retaining an element of eroticism.

Recognition
Carla van de Puttelaar won several prizes and awards, including the Dutch Prix de Rome Basic Prize. She gained international recognition following exhibitions in for example New York, Paris and Brussels. Her works have been published as book covers and in magazines like The New Yorker and The New York Times Magazine.  In 2009, she ranked 51st in the Top-100 of Dutch artists as published by Elseviers Magazine and in 2018, 2019 and 2023, she was a semi-finalist in the Artist of the Year contest of Dutch artists organized by Stichting Kunstweek.

Bibliography
 Carla van de Puttelaar. Tekst/text Rudy Kousbroek (2004) 
 Galateas. With an introduction by Kristien Hemmerechts (2008) 
 The Beholder's Eye. Text by Bob Frommé (2008) 
 Adornments. Text by Marianne Berardi (2017) 
Artfully Dressed: Women in the Art World. Texts by Marta Weiss, Rachel Kaminsky and Carla van de Puttelaar (2019) 
 Brushed by Light. Text by Rudi Ekkart (2020) 
 Synergia / Iris van Herpen, Carla van de Puttelaar. Text by Lisa Small (2021) 
 Scottish Portraiture 1644-1714, David and John Scougall and Their Contemporaries. Text by Carla van de Puttelaar (2021)

External links
Carla van de Puttelaar's official website.
Website portrait project: Artfully Dressed: Women in the Art World..
Scottish Portraiture 1644-1714.
Interview with Carla van de Puttelaar
  Video Report   Carla Van de Puttelaar 'Galateas' 2008 on OC-TV.net

1967 births
Living people
Dutch photographers
Dutch women photographers
Dutch erotic photographers
Portrait photographers
People from Zaanstad
Dutch contemporary artists
Fine art photographers
21st-century Dutch photographers
21st-century women photographers
Dutch art historians